Daniel P. Petryk (born October 5, 1965) is a Canadian curler.

He played at the 1992 Winter Olympics when curling was a demonstration sport, Canadian men's team finished at fourth place.

Teams

Personal life
His older brother Steve is a curler too. The brothers played together on the Ed Lukowich team at 1994 Labatt Brier and some years after it.

Dan Petryk graduated from University of Alberta.

He started curling in 1976 when he was 11 years old.

References

External links

Dan Petryk – Curling Canada Stats Archive
Global Maxfin Investments Inc. (Dan's company)
Calgary Herald: 2007-01-19 - Petryk brothers together again - PressReader
Canada's Dan Petryk competing in the curling event at the 1992 Albertville Olympic winter Games - ARCHIVED - Image Display - Canadian Olympians - Library and Archives Canada
Dan Petryk Gallery | The Trading Card Database
 Video: 

1965 births
Living people
Brier champions
Canadian male curlers
Curlers at the 1992 Winter Olympics
Olympic curlers of Canada
Curlers from Calgary
Curlers from Edmonton
University of Alberta alumni
Canada Cup (curling) participants